John Martin is an Australian professional racing driver. Martin has had wide experience racing in European based open-wheel series since 2006. In that time Martin has had a wide experience of open-wheel racing having driven in various national and international series driving Formula Ford, Formula 3, A1 Grand Prix and Formula Renault 3.5. For the past two season Martin has raced for several teams in the football inspired series Superleague Formula. Martin has long been associated with the British Alan Docking Racing team having raced with them in a variety of formulae for four of the five years he has been racing in Europe. In 2012 Martin will again race with ADR, racing an Oreca 03 sports car in the LMP2 class of the FIA World Endurance Championship.

Career

Karting
2004: Pole and 2nd at Australian Resa nationals ; 2nd in Queensland, Australian Rotax light ; 2nd in Queensland, Australian clubman heavy and 4th in senior national heavy
2003: Geelong Ford Kartstars championships, Australia
2002: 1st in Resa Queensland state championship
2001: 5th in Resa nationals

Formulas
He finished 28th in the 2007 Masters of Formula 3. He joined A1 Team Australia and drove in the A1 Grand Prix series during the 2007–08 season, and continued to race for the team in 2008–09. Martin drove the Rangers F.C. car in the 2009 Superleague Formula season for one win from thirteen races. In 2010 he started the Superleague Formula season with Atlético Madrid before ending the season with  Beijing Guoan, starting twenty nine races for six wins and twenty top tens.

Racing record

Career summary

† - Guest driver, ineligible for points.

‡ - Team standings.

Complete A1 Grand Prix results
(key) (Races in bold indicate pole position) (Races in italics indicate fastest lap)

Complete Formula Renault 3.5 Series results
(key) (Races in bold indicate pole position) (Races in italics indicate fastest lap)

Complete Superleague Formula results
(key) (Races in bold indicate pole position) (Races in italics indicate fastest lap)

† Non Championship round

Complete FIA World Endurance Championship results

24 Hours of Le Mans results

Complete 24 Hours of Daytona results

Complete Bathurst 12 Hour results

Complete TCR Australia results

Complete S5000 results

References

External links
 Career statistic driverdb.com
 Official web

1984 births
Living people
People from Gosford
Racing drivers from New South Wales
Formula Ford drivers
British Formula Three Championship drivers
A1 Team Australia drivers
World Series Formula V8 3.5 drivers
Superleague Formula drivers
24 Hours of Le Mans drivers
FIA World Endurance Championship drivers
24 Hours of Daytona drivers
WeatherTech SportsCar Championship drivers
Tasman Series drivers
A1 Grand Prix drivers
G-Drive Racing drivers
Action Express Racing drivers
Comtec Racing drivers
Alan Docking Racing drivers
Starworks Motorsport drivers
Double R Racing drivers
Australian Endurance Championship drivers
Garry Rogers Motorsport drivers